Monica Bharel was the commissioner of the Massachusetts Department of Public Health, appointed in February 2015.  On May 27, 2021, Bharel announced she will be stepping down effective June 18.  Bharel is an associate professor of medicine at Boston University.

She earned her medical degree from Boston University School of Medicine and completed her residency in internal medicine at Boston City Hospital/Boston Medical Center. She received her master of public health degree through the Commonwealth Fund/Harvard University Fellowship in Minority Health Policy.

She practiced general internal medicine at Massachusetts General Hospital, Boston Medical Center and the Veterans Administration. She taught at Harvard Medical School, Boston University School of Medicine, and Harvard School of Public Health.  Bharel was a leader in the creation of the Public Health Data Warehouse in 2017, as part of the newly created Office of Population Health. Immediately before becoming commissioner, she served as the chief medical officer of Boston Health Care for the Homeless.

References

Boston University School of Medicine alumni
Harvard School of Public Health alumni
Year of birth missing (living people)
Place of birth missing (living people)
Living people
American public health doctors
Physicians from Massachusetts
American internists
Boston University School of Medicine faculty
Harvard Medical School faculty
Harvard School of Public Health faculty
21st-century American women physicians
21st-century American physicians
American women academics
American city health commissioners
Women internists
Women public health doctors